Luis Fernando Cruz Ontiveros (born 16 January 1997) is a Mexican professional footballer.

References

1997 births
Living people
Association football forwards
Tigres UANL footballers
Club Atlético Zacatepec players
Tuxtla F.C. footballers
Yalmakán F.C. footballers
Ascenso MX players
Liga Premier de México players
Tercera División de México players
Footballers from Nuevo León
Sportspeople from Monterrey
Mexican footballers